Ramson Zhuwawo (born 3 November 1983, in Harare) is a retired Zimbabwean soccer player who among others played for AmaZulu in the South African Premier Soccer League.

Career
He was named 2009 Zimbabwe Soccer Star of the Year.

International career
Zhuwawo made his senior international debut for the Zimbabwe national football team at the 2009 COSAFA Cup.

References

1983 births
Living people
Sportspeople from Harare
Zimbabwean footballers
Zimbabwean expatriate footballers
Zimbabwe international footballers
Association football midfielders
Dynamos F.C. players
Gunners F.C. players
AmaZulu F.C. players
Chicken Inn F.C. players
Expatriate soccer players in South Africa
Zimbabwean expatriate sportspeople in South Africa